This article is a discography of Patti Smith, an American rock singer-songwriter. Since 1974 she has released eleven studio albums, three live albums, two EPs, nineteen singles, three compilation albums, and one box set on Arista Records and Columbia Records.

Albums

Studio albums

Live albums

Compilation albums

EPs

Singles

As lead artist

As featured artist

Non-album B-sides

Audio books

Other appearances

Studio

Live & remixes

Spoken-word

Guest appearances

Music videos

Notes

References

External links 
 
 Patti Smith discography at Rate Your Music
 Patti Smith and 
 Discography and picture gallery

Discography
Discographies of American artists
Punk rock discographies